İkinci Qaradəmirçi (also, Karadamirchi and İkinji Karademirchi) is a village and municipality in the Barda Rayon of Azerbaijan.  It has a population of 385.

References 

Populated places in Barda District